Dirty Blonde may refer to:

 Dirty Blonde: The Diaries of Courtney Love, a 2006 memoir by rock musician and actress Courtney Love
 Dirty Blonde (play), a 2000 play by Claudia Shear
 Dirty blonde, a hair color